A first responder is a person with specialized training who is among the first to arrive and provide assistance or incident resolution at the scene of an emergency, such as an accident, disaster, medical emergency, structure fire, crime, or terrorist attack. First responders typically include law enforcement officers (commonly known as police officers), paramedics, emergency medical technicians, and firefighters. In some jurisdictions, emergency department personnel, such as doctors and nurses, are also required to respond to disasters and critical situations, designating them first responders; in other jurisdictions, military and security forces may also be authorized to act as first responders.

A certified first responder is an individual who has received certification to provide pre-hospital care in a certain jurisdiction, such as the Certified First Responder in France. A community first responder is a person dispatched to attend medical emergencies until an ambulance arrives. A wilderness first responder is trained to provide pre-hospital care in remote settings who has skills relevant to ad hoc patient care and transport by non-motorized means.

Etymology

The use of the term "first responder" in the current sense first emerged in the United States in the 1970s. Perhaps the earliest uses in print occurred in two articles in The Boston Globe in August 1973, about proposed ambulance regulations in Massachusetts. 

There were some earlier uses of "first response", though not "first responder", in this sense. They included an article in the Grand Junction Daily Sentinel in March 1972, and another about the formation of a "First Response Group" composed of volunteers in The Burlington Free Press in April 1973.

A few months after its use in the Globe, the term "first-responders" appeared in a Boston Herald article about a master plan for emergency care from the Health Planning Council of Greater Boston. One of the recommendations in the plan, reported the Herald, was that "All ambulance personnel and first-responders (who are general police and firemen) should be adequately trained in emergency care such as cardopulmonary [sic] resuscitation."

"First-responder" was also used in a July 1974 classified advertisement for a deputy chief of EMT training—"to assist in developing and implementing statewide training programs for EMT's and first-responders"—from the Massachusetts Department of Public Health.

The term began appearing in newspaper articles from other parts of the United States in the second half of 1974, and was in widespread use by 1975. At some point, the dash between "first" and "responder" disappeared.

Specific jurisdictions

Some jurisdictions have special laws defining and establishing the rights and duties of first responders.

United States

The term first responder is defined in U.S. Homeland Security Presidential Directive, HSPD-8 and reads:

Issues

First responders must be trained to deal with a wide array of potential medical emergencies. Due to the high level of stress and uncertainty associated with the position, first responders must maintain physical and mental health. Even with such preparation, first responders face unique risks of being the first people to aid those with unknown contagions. For example, in 2003 first responders were among the earliest cases of the previously unknown SARS virus, when they cared for patients affected with the virus.

Infectious disease has continued to be a major occupational health concern among first responders with the COVID-19 pandemic. The CDC and other agencies and organizations have issued guidance regarding workplace hazard controls for COVID-19. Specific precautions for first responders include modified call queries, symptom screening, universal PPE use, hand hygiene, physical distancing, and stringent disinfection protocols.

Trauma

See also

 First aid
 Emergency medical responder levels by U.S. state

References 

Emergency medical responders